(July 3, 1442 – October 21, 1500) was the 103rd emperor of Japan, according to the traditional order of succession. His reign spanned the years from 1464 through 1500.

This 15th-century sovereign was named after the 12th-century Emperor Tsuchimikado and go- (後), translates literally as "later;" and thus, he could be called the "Later Emperor Tsuchimikado", or, in some older sources, may be identified as "Emperor Tsuchimikado, the second," or as "Emperor Tsuchimikado II."

Genealogy

He was the eldest son of Emperor Go-Hanazono.  His mother was Ōinomikado (Fujiwara) Nobuko (大炊御門（藤原）信子), daughter of Fujiwara Takanaga (藤原高長)

Lady-in-waiting: Niwata (Minamoto) Asako (庭田（源）朝子; 1437–1492) later Sōgyoku-mon'in (蒼玉門院), Niwata Shigekata's daughter
First son: Imperial Prince Katsuhito (勝仁親王) later Emperor Go-Kashiwabara
Second son: Imperial Prince Takaasa (1472–1504; 尊敦親王) later Imperial Prince Priest Sonden (尊伝入道親王)
Son: (1475)
Lady-in-waiting: Kajūji (Fujiwara) Fusako (勧修寺（藤原）房子), Kajūji Norihide's daughter
First daughter: Princess Daijikō-in (大慈光院宮)
Fifth daughter: Princess Rishu (理秀女王)
Fourth daughter: Princess Chien (智円女王)
daughter: (1485)
Consort: Kasannoin (Fujiwara) Tomoko (花山院（藤原）兼子), Kasannoin Mochitada's daughter
Third daughter: Princess Yozen (応善女王)
Third son: Imperial Prince Priest Ninson (仁尊法親王)
Second daughter: Princess Chien (知円女王)
Fourth son: Prince Imawaka (今若宮)
unknown
 Princess Jisho (慈勝女王)

Events of Go-Tsuchimikado's life
 August 21, 1464 (Kanshō 5, 7th month): In the 36th year of Go-Hanazono-tennōs reign (後花園天皇三十六年), the emperor abdicated; and the succession (senso) was received by his son.  Shortly thereafter, Emperor Go-Tsuchimikado is said to have acceded to the throne (sokui).

Shortly after his enthronement, the Ōnin War took place.  Temples, shrines, and mansions of court nobles, among others, were burned to the ground.  The Imperial Court's finances dried up, and the Court declined. The Emperor supported the Yoshida family's policy of establishing a new kind of State Shinto which could add social and political cohesion in the country devastated by civil war.

Until former-emperor Go-Komatsu died in 1433, Go-Hanazono held the title of formal head of the Daïri, the real power in the court was wielded by his uncle, who continued a practice known as cloistered rule.  After this, Go-Hanazono enjoyed 30 years of direct imperial rule, until his abdication; and then the conventional pattern of indirect government by cloistered emperors was again resumed.  The extended duration of Go-Tsuchimikado's reign—lasting thirty-six years, two months—is the longest of any sovereign in the historical period prior to Emperor Kōkaku.

After the end of the War, there was little enthusiasm for reviving the Imperial Court's ancient ceremonies.  On October 21, 1500, the Emperor died. His successor Go-Kashiwabara lacked the funds to pay for the funeral ceremony, and the deceased emperor's body lay in a palace storeroom for over a month before a donation was made to the court, and the funeral could be observed.

Go-Tuschimikado is enshrined with other emperors at the imperial tomb called Fukakusa no kita no misasagi (深草北陵) in Fushimi-ku, Kyoto.

Kugyō
Kugyō (公卿) is a collective term for the very few most powerful men attached to the court of the Emperor of Japan in pre-Meiji eras. Even during those years in which the court's actual influence outside the palace walls was minimal, the hierarchic organization persisted.

In general, this elite group included only three to four men at a time.  These were hereditary courtiers whose experience and background would have brought them to the pinnacle of a life's career.  During Go-Tsuchimikado's reign, this apex of the Daijō-kan included:
 Sadaijin
 Udaijin
 Naidaijin
 Dainagon

Eras of Go-Tsuchimikado's reign
The years of Go-Tsuchimikado's reign are more specifically identified by more than one era name or nengō.
 Kanshō  (1460–1466)
 Bunshō  (1466–1467)
 Ōnin     (1467–1469)
 Bunmei  (1469–1487)
 Chōkyō  (1487–1489)
 Entoku         (1489–1492)
 Meiō      (1492–1501)

Ancestry

Notes

References

 Ponsonby-Fane, Richard Arthur Brabazon. (1959).  The Imperial House of Japan. Kyoto: Ponsonby Memorial Society. OCLC 194887
 Titsingh, Isaac. (1834). Nihon Ōdai Ichiran; ou,  Annales des empereurs du Japon.  Paris: Royal Asiatic Society, Oriental Translation Fund of Great Britain and Ireland. OCLC 5850691

See also
 Emperor of Japan
 List of Emperors of Japan
 Imperial cult

Japanese emperors
1442 births
1500 deaths
Emperor Go-Tsuchimikado
Emperor Go-Tsuchimikado
Emperor Go-Tsuchimikado
Emperor Go-Tsuchimikado
Emperor Go-Tsuchimikado
Emperor Go-Tsuchimikado
15th-century Japanese monarchs